Majid Saeedi is an Iranian documentary photographer.

Early life 
Saeedi was born and raised in Tehran. He started photography at sixteen and has photographed humanitarian issues in the Middle East. Saeedi has appeared in international publications and won numerous awards.

Career
He has managed photography departments of various news agencies in Iran.

Majid won photography awards from around the world. He received the title of "The Best Photographer of Iran" eight times. His photos were published in international publications such as Times, Spiegel, Life, New York Times, Washington Post, Washington Times, Time Magazine and various Middle Eastern publications and online agencies. Majid has traveled to many countries in the Middle East and photographed injustice and atrocities. One photo story displayed the images of Afghan people whose lives have been affected by the decades of war in Afghanistan.

Awards

 2009 & 2005 POYi Awards, US
 2010 UNICEF Award, (Germany)
 2010 International Press Photo Contest (CHIPP), China
 2010 Henri Nannen Award, Germany
 2011 Lucie Award, US
 2012 Robert F. Kennedy Award, US
 2013 World Press Photo (WPP), Netherlands
 2013 National Press Photographers Association (NPPA), US
 2013 International Press Photo Contest (CHIPP), China
 2013 RPS Wall Grant, Japan
 2014 Master Award, Italy
 2014 Foto Evidence Book Award, US
 2014 Lucas Dolega Award, France
 2015 Photo Reporter, France

Exhibitions

 Siena Art Gallery, Italy 2016
 Goethe Gallery, India 2016
 Arp Museum, Germany 2015
 Esquina Gallery, Marseilles, France 2015
 Bronx Documentary Center, New York City 2015
 Charlwood Art Gallery, UK 2014
 Photo Museum Estonia, 2014
 la maison des photographs, Paris, France, 2014
 Lody Gallery, Milan, Italy 2014
 Peace Foundation Special Review, Bolzano Italy, 2014
 Uk Gallery −2013
 25th Anniversary of Visa Pour L’Image, Perpignan, France, 2013
 Reminder Photography Stronghold Wall Grant, Tokyo, Japan, 2013
 Photo Report/ Age Festival Pmarico, Basilicata, Italy, 2013
 Noorderlicht Gallery, Groningen, The Netherlands, 2012
 VII Gallery New York City, 2011
 And Plus 30 Group Exhibitions

Books

 Life in War, US
 Daily Life, France

References

External links

 Majid Saeedi official instagram
 Majid Saeedi official website

Iranian photographers
Living people
Documentary photographers
People from Tehran
1974 births